The Dee River is a river located in Central Queensland, Australia.

Course and features
The river is joined by seven minor tributaries including Limestone Creek, Horse Creek, Hamilton Creek, Nine Mile Creek, Boulder Creek, Oaky Creek and Pruce Creek. The Dee River forms its confluence with the Don River near Rannes.

The largest dam on the river is Number 7 Dam, built for the Mount Morgan Mine, which has a history of acid mine discharge from gold and copper mining entering the Dee River.

Mine pit
In January 2013, the mine pit overflowed. Approximately  of rain fell after ex-tropical Cyclone Oswald resulted in the 2013 Eastern Australia floods.  Towards the end of February the dam was spilling acid and heavy metals into the river.  Concerns regarding the discolouration of the river's water and fears of contamination causing irreversible damage to the river were raised in mid-2011.

See also

Reference

Rivers of Queensland
Central Queensland